Silver City Airport  is an airport located on the shore of Kluane Lake, Yukon, Canada.

References

Registered aerodromes in Yukon